Bolewski is a surname. Notable people with the surname include:

Alex Bolewski (1891–1981), Australian rugby league player 
Henry Bolewski (1890–1976), Australian rugby league player and coach
Mick Bolewski (1888–1974), Australian rugby league player